Batang Hari  is a regency of Jambi Province in Sumatra, Indonesia. It covers an area of 5,804.83 km2. It had a population of 241,334 at the 2010 census and 301,700 at the 2020 census. The administrative capital is the town of Muara Bulian.

Administrative districts
The regency is split administratively into eight districts (kecamatan), listed below with their areas and their populations at the 2010 census and the 2020 census. The table also includes the locations of the district centres, and the number of villages (rural desa and urban kelurahan) in each district.

Towns and villages
 Muara Bulian - regency capital
 Paalmerah
 Talang Pelempang
 Pinangtinggi
 Bejubang
 Tempino
 Talang Gudang
 Muara Bahar

References

External links
 Official website

Regencies of Jambi